Hannelore Hoger (born 20 August 1942) is a German actress and director. From 1958–1961 she studied acting at the Hochschule für Musik und Theater Hamburg. She has appeared in numerous German films, television programs, and stage productions for the last five decades.

Selected filmography

Film

1968: Artists Under the Big Top: Perplexed
1970: Der große Verhau
1972: 
1975: Ice Age
1975: The Lost Honour of Katharina Blum
1977: 
1978: Germany in Autumn
1979: 
1982: Kraftprobe
1983: 
1983: 
1984: 
1984: Super
1985: 
1987: Jacob hinter der blauen Tür
1991: Lippels Traum
1997: 
1999: Straight Shooter
1999: Long Hello and Short Goodbye
2004: hamlet_X
2010: Henri 4
2015: 
2015: Heidi

Television

1965: Zeitsperre
1965: Tag für Tag — (based on Roots)
1966: Wilhelm Tell — (based on William Tell)
1969: Marija — (based on Maria)
1970: Piggies
1970: Der Pott — (based on The Silver Tassie)
1971: Eduard IV. – Der Krieg der Rosen, 2. Teil — (based on Henry VI)
1972: Der Marquis von Keith
1973:  (TV miniseries)
1973: Kleiner Mann, was nun? — (based on Little Man, What Now?)
1974: Badische Revolte 1848
1975: Der Gehülfe
1975: Die Geisel — (based on The Hostage)
1977: Mensch Mutter
1978: Kläger und Beklagte (TV series, 7 episodes)
1978: The Day Elvis Came to Bremerhaven
1979: Die lebenslängliche Frau
1979: Eine Rückkehr
1979: Tatort: Mitternacht, oder kurz danach
1979: Tatort: Schweigegeld
1980: Ein Mann fürs Leben
1983: Der Groß-Cophta
1988: Die Bertinis (TV miniseries)
1990: Marleneken
1991: Tandem
1991: 
1991: Derrick: Ein Tod auf dem Hinterhof
1992: Die zweite Heimat (TV miniseries)
1992: The Old Fox: Der Tod ist kein Ende
1992: Tatort: Unversöhnlich
1993: Derrick: Langsamer Walzer
1994–2018: Bella Block (TV series, 38 episodes)
1994: Derrick: Eine Endstation
1994: Himmel und Hölle
1996–1997: Die Drei (TV series, 27 episodes)
1998: Nachspiel
2000: Falsche Liebe – Die Internetfalle
2001: Vier Meerjungfrauen
2002: Weihnachten im September
2005: Hölle im Kopf
2013: Uferlos
2016: Hotel Heidelberg (TV series, 5 episodes)

References

External links 
 

1941 births
German television actresses
Living people
Actresses from Hamburg
Hochschule für Musik und Theater Hamburg alumni
20th-century German actresses
21st-century German actresses